Caballeronia terrestris is a bacterium from the genus Burkholderia and  family Burkholderiaceae.

References

Burkholderiaceae
Bacteria described in 2013